Enguerrand I was the son of Hugh I of Ponthieu and Gisela, daughter of Hugh Capet.

Marriages and children
With his first wife Adelaide, daughter of Arnulf, Count of Holland, they had:
Hugh II

His second wife has been identified as the wife of Count Arnold II of Boulogne and they had:
Guy, Bishop of Amiens
Fulk (later abbot of Forest l'Abbaye)

Enguerrand died around 1045 "at a great age."

Notes

References

Sources

Further reading
The Carmen de Hastingae Proelio of Bishop Guy of Amiens, edited by Catherine Morton and Hope Muntz, Oxford at the Clarendon Press, 1972.

Counts of Ponthieu
11th-century French people
10th-century French people